Bobo River, a mostly perennial stream of the Clarence River catchment, is located in the Northern Tablelands district of New South Wales, Australia.

Course and features
Bobo River rises on the western slopes of Mount Wondurrigah, within the Great Dividing Range, near Tallwood Point. The river flows generally northwest and north, before reaching its confluence with the Little Nymboida River, near Moleton, within the Cascade National Park. The river descends  over its  course.

See also

 Rivers of New South Wales

References

 

Rivers of New South Wales
Northern Tablelands